Uqi Uqini (Aymara uqi uqi a species of plant, uqi brown, grey brown, the reduplication indicates that there is a group or a complex of something, -ni a suffix to indicate ownership, "the one with the uqi uqi plant" or "the one with a complex of grey-brown color", Hispanicized spelling Oke Okeni) is a  volcano in the Andes. It is situated in the Cordillera Occidental on the border of Bolivia and Chile. Uqi Uqini is located in the Arica and Parinacota Region of Chile and in the Oruro Department of Bolivia, in the Sajama Province, Turku Municipality, Chachakumani Canton. Uqi Uqini lies south of National Route 4 near the Chungara-Tambo Quemado pass and north of Umurata, Acotango and Capurata.

Uqi Uqini is a twin volcano formed by andesite, dacite and rhyolite and is of Pleistocene age just like the volcanoes Kimsa Chata complex.

See also
 List of mountains in the Andes

References 

Volcanoes of Arica y Parinacota Region
Volcanoes of Oruro Department
International mountains of South America
Bolivia–Chile border